Nagaram Marupakkam also known simply as Nagaram is a 2010 Indian Tamil-language action comedy film co-produced written and directed by Sundar C., who himself plays the lead role. Co-produced by his wife Khushbu, the film also stars Anuya Bhagvath and Vadivelu in pivotal roles and features music by Thaman. Sundar's first directorial after four years, Nagaram released on 19 November 2010, it is based on the 1993 American film Carlito's Way. The film is very well known for comedy sequences and portrayal of the comic character "Style Pandi" by Vadivelu.

Plot

Selvam (Sundar C.), a criminal, decides to turn a new life after coming out of jail. He lands a job in Hyderabad and falls in love with a dancer named Bharathi (Anuya Bhagvath). Eventually, his past catches up to him. How he gets out of the predicament forms the story.

Cast

 Sundar C. as Selvam
 Anuya Bhagvath as Bharathi
 Vadivelu as Style Pandi
 Bose Venkat as Sakkara Pandi
 George Vishnu as Dhamu
 Sulile Kumar as Kaasi
 Ponnambalam as 'Thala Vetti' Thangarasu
 Vichu Vishwanath as 'Kudal Pudungi' Govindhan
 Besant Ravi as 'Kaal Vetti' Karuppiah
 Vittal Rao as Annachi
 Chitra Shenoy as Bharathi's mother and Annachi's second wife
 Nalini as Annachi's first wife
 V. S. Raghavan as Seth
 R. S. Shivaji as Director
 Halwa Vasu as Pandi's assistant
 Crane Manohar as Pandi's assistant
 Gowtham Sundararajan
 Ennatha Kannaiya
 Mano as Naidu
G. Srinivasan as Kadhar Bhai
 Gowthami Vembunathan as House Owner (Maami)
 Bosskey as Inspector Venkatesh
 Vikas Rishi as Anwar
 Shobana
 Krishnamoorthy
 Muthukaalai
 Bava Lakshmanan as Pandi's assistant
 Velmurugan as Karadi
 Sakthivel as Iyer
 Vengal Rao as Lorry driver
 Maryam Zakaria as item number

Soundtrack

Music is composed by S. Thaman and Released on Think Music India.

Reception
Behindwoods wrote "Sundar has managed to pack a punch with the narrative style of the movie and the climax tugs at your heart. Besides, he has also diversified from his style of movie making to take up a serious subject of friendship and betrayal. On the whole, but for a few glitches here and there, Nagaram is not bad a watch." Sify wrote "It is engrossing and moves like a thriller, with rapid twists and turns leading to a stunning climax". Nowrunning wrote "
Despite such flaws "Nagaram" works because of its racy script and neat execution."

References

External links
 

2010 action comedy films
2010s crime comedy films
2010 films
Films directed by Sundar C.
2010s Tamil-language films
Indian gangster films
Films scored by Thaman S
Indian action comedy films
Indian crime comedy films
2010 comedy films